Carl Lindquist may refer to:

 Carl Lindquist (baseball) (1919–2001), pitcher in Major League Baseball
 Carl Lindquist (actor) (born 1988), Swedish actor and singer
 Carl Lindquist (judge), Chief Justice of the Montana Supreme Court
 Carl G. Lindquist (1896–1993), dairy farmer and legislator in Michigan